Rossman Hill is a mountain in Schoharie County, New York. It is located northwest of North Blenheim. Fulton Hill is located northwest, Towpath Mountain is located east-northeast, and Burnt Hill is located south of Rossman Hill.

References

Mountains of Schoharie County, New York
Mountains of New York (state)